The 19417/19418 Mumbai Central - Ahmedabad Express is an express train of the Indian Railways connecting  in Maharashtra and  of Gujarat. It is currently being operated with 19417/19418 train numbers on a daily basis.

Service

The 19417/Mumbai Central - Ahmedabad Express has average speed of 35 km/hr and covers 492 km in 14 hrs 15 mins.

The 19418/Ahmedabad - Mumbai Central Express has average speed of 32 km/hr and covers 492 km in 15 hrs 20 mins.

Route 

Coach composite

The train consists of 15 coaches:

 5 Sleeper Class
 8 Unreserved/General
 2 Seating cum Luggage Rake

Traction

The 19417/19418 Mumbai Central - Ahmedabad Express is hauled by a Valsad based WAP 4

Rack Sharing 

The train shares its rake with 19425/19426 Mumbai Central–Nandurbar Express.

External links 

 19417/Mumbai Central - Ahmedabad Express
 19418/Ahmedabad - Mumbai Central Express

References 

Mumbai–Ahmedabad trains
Express trains in India
Transport in Mumbai
Transport in Ahmedabad